The following is a list of players and who appeared in at least one game for the Columbus Solons Major League Baseball franchise of the American Association from  through .



B
Mark Baldwin
Ned Bligh

C
Elton Chamberlain
Ed Clark
Dad Clarke
Elmer Cleveland
Jack Crooks

D
Ed Daily
John Dolan
Jim Donahue
Tom Dowse
Jack Doyle
Charlie Duffee

E
Henry Easterday
Jack Easton

F
Tom Ford

G
Hank Gastright
Bill George
Bill Greenwood

J
Spud Johnson

K
Heinie Kappel
Rudy Kemmler
Frank Knauss
Phil Knell
Bill Kuehne

L
Mike Lehane
Jack Leiper
John Lyston

M
Lefty Marr
Al Mays
Sparrow McCaffrey
Jim McTamany
John Munyan

N
Sam Nicholl

O
Jack O'Connor
Tim O'Rourke
Dave Orr

P
Jimmy Peoples

R
Charlie Reilly

S
John Sneed
Jim Sullivan

T
Larry Twitchell

W
John Weyhing
Bobby Wheelock
Wild Bill Widner

External links
Baseball Reference

Major League Baseball all-time rosters